Vindicator (Heather MacNeil Hudson) is a fictional superhero appearing in American comic books published by Marvel Comics. Following James Hudson's apparent death, Heather Hudson became the leader of Alpha Flight and took the mantle of Vindicator, which was also originally used by Heather's husband, although he eventually settles on the name Guardian. She eventually took her husband's mantle of Guardian, until she later resumed the codename Vindicator.

Publication history

Heather Hudson first appeared in The Uncanny X-Men #139 (Nov 1980) and was created by Chris Claremont and John Byrne.

Fictional character biography
Heather was born in Calgary, Alberta, Canada. She was originally a secretary at Amcam corporation, where she fell in love with James MacDonald Hudson. After he had stolen his power suit to prevent it from being used as a military weapon, Heather discovered his secret and decided to share it with him. Soon after they were married.

Heather supported her husband in the forming of Department H and his becoming a superhero. She also assisted Wolverine in a time of trouble before his career with the X-Men, and was later reunited with him.

After Department H is dissolved, Heather brought the members of the disbanded Alpha Flight together to battle Tundra of the Great Beasts. With this initiative creating a spectacular success, the team decided to continue operating Alpha Flight as an independent group. Before Alpha Flight had been back together for long, Heather witnessed the apparent death of James Hudson. She was then injured attempting to rescue a child from an alien Plodex.

Heather is asked by the members of Alpha Flight to take over leadership of the team when her husband James, the leader of Alpha Flight, is apparently killed. She accepts, though initially she leads purely as a non-combatant. She led Alpha Flight on a mission with the X-Men, and was temporarily transformed by the mystic Fire Fountain. This transforms her into a state Loki refers to as a 'demi-god'. She has increased leadership abilities along with vague powers that put her above all other humans. She rejects these powers when all involved learn it would come at the cost of humanity's creativity and the lives of anyone magical, such as her two friends Shaman and Snowbird. She was briefly "reunited" with what she thought was James Hudson, but who really turned out to be an impostor – the robot Delphine Courtney. Her body was temporarily distorted by Scramble, and then she was captured by Deadly Ernest.

Eventually, these dangerous encounters led to Heather adopting a copy of her husband's battle-suit. Through extensive training by Wolverine, Heather is able to hold her own in a battle. Heather teamed with Wolverine against Lady Deathstrike, and took the name Vindicator. She became stranded in the Savage Land, and formed the mutated natives into a team called Alpha Prime. Some time later, Heather was forced to defend Alpha Flight in a Parliamentary hearing.

Eventually her husband returns and her suit is altered to manipulate geothermal forces and she takes the name Guardian. Soon after that, she battled the Fantastic Four.

Heather and James have a baby (an as-yet-unnamed girl) and travel with their child and several other members of Alpha Flight to return a clutch of Plodex eggs to their homeworld. In addition, an accident brings temporal copies of most of the original Alpha Flight – from a time before her husband's "death" – to the present. This group includes a copy of Heather. While she is not a member, this "new" group is active as Alpha Flight while the originals are helping to rebuild the Plodex homeworld.

Alpha Flight (the team consisting of Sasquatch, Guardian, Vindicator, Shaman, Major Mapleleaf II, and both Pucks) are brutally attacked by a new villain "the Collective". They are killed and their bodies are left in the Yukon Territory as the Collective continues on to the United States.

During the Chaos War storyline, Vindicator (alongside Guardian, Shaman, and Marrina Smallwood) are among the heroes that return from the dead after what happened to the death realms. Reuniting with Aurora, Northstar, Sasquatch, and Snowbird, Alpha Flight gets back together to fight the Great Beasts.

During the Fear Itself storyline, Vindicator helped Alpha Flight in fighting Attuma in the form of Nerkodd: Breaker of Oceans. When Alpha Flight returns to their headquarters, they are betrayed by Gary Cody and his newly elected Unity Party. Vindicator sides with Cody. It is shown that six weeks earlier, Guardian and Vindicator were unable to regain custody of their child. While bringing Guardian to the Box Units for imprisonment, Vindicator is ambushed by Puck who knocks Vindicator out. After reclaiming her daughter Claire from her cousin, Vindicator assembles Alpha Strike (consisting of Persuasion, Ranark, a Wendigo, and a brainwashed Citadel) to spread the Unity program and take down Alpha Flight. It is later revealed that Vindicator and Department H had actually fallen under the mental control of Master of the World. While at a beach in Ontario with Claire, Vindicator is visited by Wolverine who states that the people in the United States are starting to be concerned about the Unity Party's actions, and when he saw Vindicator call the rest of Alpha Flight traitors Wolverine decided to investigate. Vindicator then accompanies Alpha Strike into attacking Alpha Flight, Taskmaster, and Wolverine. Vindicator fights Guardian, who tries to get through to Vindicator by stating that Master of the World is controlling her. At the end of the Alpha Flight series, Vindicator (still under the influence of the Master) helped Alpha Flight against Alpha Strike and then Master of the World attempts to kill their child Claire. He was killed by Alpha Flight but Vindicator escapes with Claire. After the Unity Party is abolished, Vindicator leaves Canada with her daughter Claire.

Powers and abilities
Formerly, Vindicator wore the Guardian suit that her husband currently wears. Currently Heather's suit, which she first employed in Alpha Flight vol. 2, taps into a different source for its power. Instead of manipulating electromagnetic energies, this suit allows its wearer to control geothermal energy, allowing Heather to melt rock and manipulate the resulting lava, create jets of lava, create both hot and cold jets of water, including jets of steam and cooling sprays of water. The suit can absorb heat into its power cells, provides its wearer with a personal force field, and enables feats of super-strength and super-speed.

Heather is a master combat strategist, and received combat training in hand-to-hand combat from Puck and Wolverine.

Other versions

Exiles
A black Canadian version of Heather Hudson, who served as her Alpha Flight's version of Sasquatch, was a member of the Exiles, recruited against her will to replace a brain-damaged Thunderbird by the Timebroker. A brilliant scientist and physician, she became Sasquatch after being accidentally exposed to gamma rays. She was recruited to Alpha Flight as the team's muscle and medic, and shortly afterwards met Wolverine when he was found wandering the wilderness after escaping from the Weapon X facility. Heather successfully restored Wolverine to sanity, and the two fell in love and married. Two years later, Weapon X activated a hidden trigger in Wolverine's mind, forcing Heather to kill him when he went on a rampage. After years of mourning, she remarried Alpha Flight commander James Hudson, who had comforted her in her grief.

Ultimate Marvel
Heather Hudson also appears as the non-powered wife of James Hudson, who she was introduced to by Wolverine, and is adoptive mother of Wolverine's son James Hudson Jr.

In other media

Television
 Heather Hudson appears in the X-Men episode "Repo Man", voiced by Rebecca Jenkins.

Video games
 Heather Hudson as Vindicator appears in X-Men Legends II, voiced by Marsha Clark.

References

External links
Vindicator (Heather Hudson) at the Marvel Universe
 Vindicator at AlphaFlight.Net

Canadian superheroes
Canadian-themed superheroes
Characters created by Chris Claremont
Characters created by John Byrne (comics)
Comics characters introduced in 1980
Fictional characters from Alberta
Fictional secretaries
Marvel Comics martial artists
Marvel Comics superheroes
Marvel Comics female superheroes
X-Men supporting characters